William Cliff (born André Imberechts, 27 December 1940) is a Francophone Belgian poet. He was born in Gembloux. His poems had the good fortune to be noticed early on by Raymond Queneau, and were published continuously by Gallimard until 1986. Cliff won the Prix Goncourt de la Poésie in 2014.

Works 
 Homo sum, Gallimard, in Cahier de poésie 1, 1973
 Écrasez-le, Gallimard, 1976
 réédition Écrasez-le, précédé de Homo sum, Gallimard, 2002, 
 Marcher au charbon, Gallimard, 1978
 America, Gallimard, 1983
 En Orient, Gallimard, 1986
 Conrad Detrez, Le Dilettante, Paris, 1990
 Fête Nationale, Gallimard, 1992
 Autobiographie, La Différence, 1993
 Journal d'un Innocent, Gallimard, 1996
 L'État belge, poèmes, La Table Ronde, 2001
 La Sainte Famille, (roman) La Table Ronde, 2001
 Adieu patries, Le Rocher, coll. Anatolia, Monaco, 2001
 Le Passager, (roman) Le Rocher, coll. Anatolia, Monaco, 2003
 Passavant la Rochère, Virgile, 2004
 La Dodge, (roman autobiographique) Le Rocher, coll. Anatolia, Monaco, 2004
 L'Adolescent, (roman) Le Rocher, coll. Anatolia, Monaco, 2005, 
 Le Pain quotidien, La Table Ronde, 2006, 
 Immense Existence, Gallimard, 2007, 
 Épopées, La Table Ronde, 2008, 

Translations
 Jaime Gil de Biedma, Un corps est le meilleur ami de l'homme, Le Rocher, coll. Anatolia
 Gabriel Ferrater, Les Femmes et les Jours, Le Rocher, coll. Anatolia, Monaco, 2004, 
 Dante, L'Enfer, Éditions du Hazard, 2013, La Table Ronde, 2014
 Dante, Le Purgatoire, Éditions du Hazard, 2019, La Table Ronde, 2021

Awards and honors

1993 Prix Maurice Carême
2001 Prix Marcel Thiry for L'Etat belge
2004 Prix triennal de poésie for Adieu patries
2007 Grand prix de poésie de l'Académie française for oeuvre of poetry.
2007 Prix Roger-Kowalski 
2010 Prix Quinquennal de littérature for oeuvre
2014 Prix Goncourt de la Poésie

References

External links
 William CLIFF (Gembloux 1940) (APFF)
 "William Cliff Poésie et vérité", l'Humanité, 15 April 2004 Jean-Claude Lebrun 
 Critique of two of his books by Pascale Arguedas
 "Le prix quinquennal de littérature à William Cliff" at RTBF 

1940 births
Living people
Belgian poets in French
People from Gembloux